Extra Statutory Concession C16 (ESC C16) was an extra statutory concession which was available in the United Kingdom until 1 March 2012. Its main purpose was to allow shareholders of solvent companies which were surplus to requirements, to get funds out via the cheap and simple striking off method, whilst still obtaining the tax benefits which legally were only available under a members voluntary liquidation (sometimes abbreviated to MVL).

Upon striking a company off, by default, and distributed funds paid out prior to the process being completed would be taxed on the shareholder as dividends. Under a members voluntary liquidation, the same funds paid out would be taxed on the shareholder as a capital gain. Especially where entrepreneurs relief was available, capital gains tax typically lead to much lower personal tax bills than dividends would.

To avoid companies having to spend several thousand pounds on a formal liquidation, by concession, HMRC would allow you to have capital gains tax treatment even under a striking off, providing advance clearance was obtained and you met certain criteria.

From 1 March 2012 this is no longer the case. If the company funds are below £25,000, upon strike off they will automatically be taxed on the shareholder as a capital gain (no application required). However, if the funds are above £25,000, the whole amount will be taxed as dividends.

This means if you wish to get rid of a solvent company with more than £25,000 in the bank, it is often worthwhile to have it formally liquidated. Only a firm of licensed insolvency practitioner can perform liquidations, but there are now several firms offering cheap members voluntary liquidations to cater to this market.

Taxation in the United Kingdom
Extra statutory concessions